The documented history of make-up in Japan begins in the Edo period. While modern western makeup styles such as in Europe and the US emphasize pinpoint makeup for the eyes and mouth, modern Japanese styles place more emphasis on foundation, base makeup, and skin-care.

History

The Edo Period(1603-1868): feudal society 
The Edo period is defined as the period from 1867, when the Tokugawa family positioned itself at the center of politics, to 1878, when Yoshinobu Tokugawa returned the power to the emperor. In this period, the samurai rose their status, and the standard of living improved significantly. While the authority refused to have relationships with other countries, Japan created its own unique culture in this period. Furthermore, Japan has experienced feudal society in the process of its development, which is called feudalism(幕藩体制).  There was a relationship of master and servant between the people and the Tokugawa family. Tokugawa family was in control of all military, administrative, and judicial which were necessary to run the country.

Makeup was considered as a part of grooming and etiquette. Therefore, women were not allowed to remain without makeup for even a day. This teaching came from a book that was widely-known for women's educational book, "Onna thouhouki(女重宝記)" published in 1692. There were mainly four major types of cosmetics in this period; powder, lipstick, eyebrow, and tooth blackening. The powder was called "Oshiroi" in Japanese. Oshiroi was made from mercury or lead. While ordinary citizens used lead as their powder, women of high status used mercury for their powder because the powder which was made from lead was cheaper than the powder which was made from mercury. In this period, most people believed that whitening was very important. There was even a proverb that  a woman with a white face hid seven problems. That means if a woman had a problem with her body or character, it would not be a problem as long as the woman had a white face. In addition, the trend was influenced by the decision of the shogunate government such as sumptuary laws that made people live simply. This kind of law was established by the government because of their austerity policy. Since it prohibited luxury, it was thought that people should avoid heavy makeup and that light makeup was suitable. This notion was also mentioned in "Zyokyouhidensho(女鏡秘伝書)"published in 1650 and "Zyoyoukinmouzui(女用訓蒙図彙" published in 1678. According to these books, makeup should be done just for grooming and for showing politeness. However, while this trend was spreading in Edo, Citizens who were  in Kyoto or Osaka preferred heavy makeup to light makeup because they admired the way of makeup that women of the Imperial Household did. The women of the emperor's family wore heavy makeup to emphasize their glamorous appearance. One possible reason why such differences emerged in different regions is that people in Edo, where the shogunate was located, were strongly influenced by the sumptuary laws issued by the shogunate, whereas for the people in Osaka and Kyoto, where the emperor originally lived, was still influenced by the emperor than shogunate administration.

On the other hand, when it comes to teeth blackening which was used for distinguishing status and situation, women were required to take good care of it. Tooth blackening is called "Ohaguro" in Japanese. People could judge women's situation by looking at their teeth and eyebrows. For instance, if a woman paints her teeth black, people can say the woman is married. Additionally, if the woman also shaves her eyebrows, she must be someone's mother.

The Meiji Period(1868-1912): modernization 
This period was completely different from the previous period that had an isolation policy. The Meiji government actively tried to adopt the culture of other countries. In addition, the feudal system ended and a centralized system that gave sovereignty to the emperor began again.  The government brought various kinds of knowledge and technology from the advanced countries of Europe and the United States to Japan. This policy had a great impact on Japan's cosmetic culture.

In this period, tooth blackening and eyebrow shaving were rejected as old-fashioned makeup. Instead, new cosmetics and makeup methods were spread by new media such as daily newspapers and monthly magazines. In the early Meiji period, the government invited engineers from abroad and actively introduced technologies in the field of chemistry. It began to produce Westernized cosmetics domestically. Along with this trend, the predecessors of Shiseido and Kao, the current leaders in the cosmetics industry, also appeared. However, due to lack of technology and production capacity to produce western cosmetics, the prices were expensive. Thus, these products were popular only upper class.

Shiseido is the largest top share company in Japan and five largest shares in the world. More than 60% of sales come from overseas business, and the company is expanding its business in approximately 120 countries and regions around the world. This company was founded by Arinobu Fukuhara in Ginza, Tokyo in 1872. This was Japan's first private Westernized dispensing pharmacy. Shiseido sold Japanese first toothpaste in 1888, and they entered the cosmetic industry in 1897. After that, Shinzo Fukuhara was appointed president and director, and the current Shiseido Company, Limited, was born in 1927. After World War II, Shiseido began to expand overseas. Shiseido began selling its products in Taiwan in 1957, and then expanded their business to various countries including Italy, the United States, and Singapore. Shiseido increased its influence in the world by establishing new companies overseas and acquiring various overseas companies.

Tomio Nagase founded Nagase shoten which was Koa's predecessor in 1887. Kao soap, a high-grade cosmetic soap, was launched in 1890, and the product was a big hit. This inspired the toiletry market in Japan. Some time after World War II, Kao established their first overseas operation base in Thailand in 1964. Since then, Kao has established bases not only in Asia, but also in Europe and the United States. As a result, the company has gained a big share of the overseas market. Kao has the third largest of the sales in Japan's cosmetics market.

The Taisho Period(1912-1926): Great War and special demand 
Japan's economy was in a difficult situation due to the national debt created by the Russo-Japanese War. However, because of World war I broken out in 1914, Japan's economy recovered and grew substantially.

Westernization progressed and people's lives were enriched, which Western-style makeup became commonplace not only among the upper class but also among the general public. The movement of women into the workforce also contributed to the development of makeup culture because women were required to groom themselves when they worked. Based on that, some cosmetics which enabled women to put on makeup quickly were sold well.  Besides, in this period, major domestic companies modernized their production facilities, and the development of domestic cosmetics became more active. As a result, the product lineup increased significantly compared to the previous period. Still, Japanese women longed for whiter faces, so more companies aggressively advertised products that claimed to whiten skin.

The Showa Period(1926-1944)  
After the Axis’ power’s defeat in World War II, Japan was ruled by the United States. Despite this, Japan became a very influential country economically because of the Vietnam War. This is because many Japanese products were exported through wars that were not directly related to Japan.

Before and during the World War II (1926-1944) 
With the spread of television and radio including magazines, information became more widespread in this period, and the information gap between rural and urban areas narrowed.

During the Showa period, there was a lot of exchange with overseas engineers on cosmetics, but trade controls began in 1937 during the Sino-Japanese War. That caused a serious problem in the cosmetic industry because a large tariff was placed on cosmetics from overseas. Because of the priority given to the military, less and less makeup was used as a fashion, and the style of makeup was reduced to the minimum necessary for personal appearance. As imports from overseas became more difficult to obtain, the cosmetic products decreased dramatically. In the last two years of the Pacific War, air raids made life difficult for many Japanese, and the amount of cosmetics products dropped sharply. That is why this period was known as "blank period for cosmetics".

After World War II (1945-1989) 
Many products were imported from the U.S. due to the U.S. presence in Japan. As people began to watch movies on color film, women imitated the makeup techniques of actresses. In the 1950s, more and more women wanted to look like Caucasian women with a three-dimensional face, and makeup shifted to pinpoint makeup that emphasized the lips and eyes in a Western style. With the spread of color TVs, major cosmetic companies began to focus on commercials in the 1960s, raising awareness of the importance of makeup. The culture in which white skin was considered good gradually changed, and more and more women longed for white skin. From the 1950s to the end of the Showa period, the trend of mass production and mass consumption which everyone owned and used the same things changed, and diversification and individualization progressed. As a result, a culture called "corrective makeup" became famous. This makeup style was used in that people could make use of one's individuality based on their facial parts. In addition to that, due to some factors such as pollution and ultraviolet rays, people began to pay more attention to the environment and their health. Therefore, they began to buy cosmetics made from healthier ingredients and sunscreens. In the 1970s, eyebrows and eyes became important points for makeup. This trend was widely covered in magazines, and people believed that they could create the atmosphere they wanted by making-up their eyebrows and eyes.With the law for Equal Employment Opportunity of Men and Women in 1985, women expressed their strong will to be able to work in a male society by drawing thick eyebrows. On the other hand, at this time, there was a growing trend that men should not neglect to wear makeup as well. Because of that, some men tried to create a "masculine" look by using eyebrow pencil and foundation. However, not everyone accepted this movement. Some people believed that what makes you look good was from internal factor such as personality, compassion, and mentality, and not from external factor such as makeup.

The Heisei Period(1989-2019) 
Women of this period were fascinated by the actresses in movies and dramas and tried to be as close as possible. In other words, the trends of the period were created by the popular actresses. In addition to that, popular magazines for teenage girls such as Non-no, Vivi, and Zipper appeared, and these girls referred to the makeup methods of the models appearing in those magazines. As this environment developed, the age when women started wearing makeup became younger and younger, and this trend accelerated from the 1990s. Also, as in the Showa period, because women continued to place importance on makeup around the eyes, mony of them used mascara to emphasize their eyes. On the other hand, foundation was still the main cosmetic product for women who aspired to have a clear skin.

Male cosmetics 
Among men, eyebrows, white powder, and Ohaguro had been used by court nobles since the Muromachi period. This type of makeup continued among the imperial family until the beginning of the Meiji period. However, as with the history of women's makeup, the influence of Westernization led to the demise of makeup such as white powder, eyebrow shaving, and Ohaguro. Instead of those practices, men began to pay more attention to beard and hairstyle because they wanted to show off their manliness as the government's policy of increasing wealth and military power spread. This is because they longed for Western culture and the beard was one of the parts that characterized the adult male. Thus, the way of makeup to make oneself look beautiful disappeared, and grooming to show off one's dignity and smartness became the mainstream. After the war, several cosmetic companies launched to sell products that promoted men's natural makeup, but they did not become as popular as the companies thought due to the rejection of the Meiji-period generation that put their importance on masculinity. One interesting trend, however, was shown up. Men paid attention to the fashions and unique hairstyles that athletes appearing on TV did. Therefore, they spent their time and money to become desirable looks. Furthermore, as women began to enter the workforce because of the law for Equal Employment Opportunity of Men and Women, conventional idea of masculinity was faded away. Instead of that, the time when men apply makeup for their beauty came back.

References

Makeup
Cultural history of Japan